Florida's 5th Senate District elects one member of the Florida Senate. The district consists of part of Duval county, in the U.S. state of Florida. The current Senator is Democrat Tracie Davis.

List of Senators 
NOTE: The following Information was gathered from the Florida Senate website. Only records of senators from 1998-present are kept.

Elections 
NOTE: The following results were gathered from the Florida Department of State. Uncontested election results are not provided.

1980

1982

1986

1988

1992

2000

2004

2008

2020

2022 

Florida Senate districts